"All Right" is a song written and recorded by American singer-songwriter Christopher Cross. It was released in January 1983 as the lead single from the album, Another Page.  On the heels of his Grammy winning first album, and following his #1 hits "Sailing" and "Arthur's Theme (The Best that You Can Do)", expectations were strong enough for it to debut on the Billboard Hot 100 at #29.  It was the fifth-highest debuting single of the 1980s, ranking behind Michael Jackson's "Thriller" (No. 20), USA for Africa's "We Are the World" (No. 21), Paul McCartney's and Michael Jackson's "Say Say Say" (No. 26), and Men at Work's "Overkill" (No. 28). The single, which featured former Doobie Brother Michael McDonald on background vocals, peaked at #12.

The song gained a measure of fame when it was used by CBS Sports for its highlight montage of the 1983 NCAA Division I men's basketball tournament at the end of its broadcast of the championship game. The game, which saw North Carolina State, led by coach Jim Valvano, upset heavily favored Houston 54-52 when Lorenzo Charles caught an airballed shot by teammate Dereck Whittenburg and slammed the ball through the hoop on the game's final play, is widely regarded as one of the most memorable games in NCAA tournament history. Four years later, CBS introduced One Shining Moment to accompany tournament highlights at the end of the championship game broadcast, a tradition which continues.

"All Right" was featured in the NBA footage bloopers during the 1982–83 season.
It was also featured in the opening video of the Apple Worldwide Developers Conference 2017.

Track listing 
 All Right 4:01	
 Long World 3:32

Personnel
Christopher Cross — Lead vocals, guitar
Michael Omartian – keyboards , synthesizers, arrangements
Mike Porcaro — bass guitar
Steve Lukather - electric guitar, guitar solo
Jeff Porcaro — drums
Rob Meurer – keyboards, synthesizers programming, synthesizers, arrangements
Michael McDonald — background vocals
Paulinho Da Costa – percussion
Lenny Castro – percussion

Charts

References

1983 singles
Christopher Cross songs
Song recordings produced by Michael Omartian
Songs written by Christopher Cross
Warner Records singles
1983 songs